Ellen Elgin was an American scientist and inventor.

Early life 
Elgin was born in 1849 in Washington, D.C., with few details available about her childhood and earlier life. In her younger years, Elgin spent her time working as a clerk in a local census office as well spending time as a housekeeper where she was a servant to Timothy Nooning and his wife Malintha and their son William. As a housekeeper, Elgin's domestic duties consisted of chores such as cleaning and washing clothes, a task that was heavily reliant on manual labor at the time. To make matters worse, women were largely tasked with housekeeping duties in their personal homes as well, doubling the work for Elgin. Due to the grueling work that came with washing laundry, there was opportunity for someone to make this process easier and Elgin realized such. This sparked her idea of her soon to come innovation.

Her inventions 
Although the time which Elgin had initially thought of her innovation is unclear, it is documented that in 1888, Elgin completed the invention – a clothes wringer. This device consisted of wooden rollers and a crank that allowed wet clothes to be inserted and wrung out before being hung up to dry. The clothes wringer featured a mechanism that allowed you to change the roller speed to assist with larger/thinner garments. Though Elgin is now recognized as being the inventor of such technology, it was largely unknown at the time due to it not being patented and published under her name. Elgin ended up selling the device and its patent to an agent in 1888, reportedly for $18. At the time, women inventors struggled to gain recognition for their inventions and the rights that came with them. Additionally, Elgin was an African-American woman which increased the likelihood of her invention being overlooked. Consequently, Elgin chose to sell the patent to her device in hopes of a better chance for marketing the product on a larger scale. According to Charlotte Smith of The Woman Inventor, when questioned why she decided to sell her invention she replied “You know I am black and if it was known that a Negro woman patented the invention, white ladies would not buy the wringer; I was afraid to be known because of my color in having it introduced in the market, that is the only reason.” As a result, Elgin's patent credits Cyrenus Wheeler Junior as the inventor and provided Elgin with no subsequent revenues or profits from the device.

Future impact 
Briefly after the time of Elgin's patent, companies such as American Wringer Co. were buying as many wringer patents as they could and manufacturing them for retail. One example of American Wringer's products is shown, very similar to the visual of the patent also shown. Unfortunately there is no record depicting whether Elgin's patent was acquired by American Wringer Co.
 Although technology has improved since the late 1800s with the invention of the washing machine and dryer, Elgin's contributions to concept of wringing something out is still widely seen today in devices such as mop buckets which feature a wringer to squeeze excess water.

Late life 
Little is known about Elgin's later life stage though it is assumed that Elgin died after 1890 with directory information pointing to residence still in Washington D.C. up to 1915.

References 

1849 births
20th-century deaths
People from Washington, D.C.
19th-century American inventors